In probability theory, a McKean–Vlasov process is a stochastic process described by a stochastic differential equation where the coefficients of the diffusion depend on the distribution of the solution itself. The equations are a model for Vlasov equation and were first studied by Henry McKean in 1966.

Definition 
McKean–Vlasov processes take the formwhere  describes the law of X and dB denotes the Wiener process. That is the coefficients of the SDE depend on the marginal distribution of the process X. In general, the process can describe non-linear diffusion.

Applications 

 Mean-field theory
 Mean-field game theory
 Random matrices: including Dyson's model on eigenvalue dynamics for random symmetric matrices and the Wigner semicircle distribution

References

Stochastic differential equations